Berhane Adere Debala (Ge'ez: ብርሀኔ አደሬ born 21 July 1973) is a retired Ethiopian long-distance runner who specialised in the 10,000 metres and half marathon. She won the gold medal in the 10,000 m at the 2003 World Championships and silver medals in the event at the 2001 and 2005 World Championships. Adere claimed gold and silver for the 3000 metres at the 2003 and 2004 World Indoor Championships respectively. Her medal in 2003 was the Ethiopia’s first world indoor medal in a women’s event. At the half marathon, she was the World champion in 2002, took silver in 2003 and bronze in 2001. She won the Chicago Marathon in 2006 and 2007.

Adere held the world indoor record for the 3000 m, set in 2002, which was the first sub-8:30 mark run by a woman indoors and the first world indoor record in a distance event by an Ethiopian woman. She also held the world indoor record in the 5000 m, set in 2004.

Adere works for UNICEF as a goodwill ambassador for girls' education.

Career
Berhane held the African record for the 10,000 metres in a time of 30:04.18, set at the 2003 World Championships, where she won gold. Her record was broken at the 2008 Beijing Olympics by Tirunesh Dibaba, who became the first African woman to run under 30 minutes in the event.

She won the 2006 Chicago Marathon with a personal best time of 2:20:42. She won the Chicago Marathon again in 2007 and the Dubai Marathon on 18 January 2008. Berhane also claimed victory in the 2007 Ras Al Khaimah Half Marathon.

She was the top female finisher in the 2010 Rock ‘n’ Roll Mardi Gras Marathon, in which she recorded the fastest ever half marathon on American soil with a time of 1:07:52, breaking her previous best by over 25 seconds.  At age 36, that should also be the Masters world record.  She saw off a challenge from Ana Dulce Félix to win at the Great North Run in September, completing the half marathon in 1:08:49. In 2012, she had two races, both in October in Britain, where she was runner-up at the Great Birmingham Run and third at the Great South Run.

Achievements

International competitions

Personal bests
 3000 metres – 8:25.62 (Zürich 2001)
 3000 metres indoor – 8:29.15 (Stuttgart 2002)
 5000 metres – 14:29.32 (Oslo 2003)
 5000 metres indoor – 14:39.29 (Stuttgart 2004)
 10,000 metres – 30:04.18 (Paris-Saint-Denis 2003)
Road
 5 kilometres – 14:54 (Carlsbad, CA 2003)
 10 kilometres – 31:07 (Manchester 2006)
 Half marathon – 1:07:52 (New Orleans, LA 2010)
 Marathon – 2:20:42 (Chicago, IL 2006)

References

External links

Berhane Adere in the half marathon in Rotterdam 2007
Cheering Adere From The Back - From Ethiopian Running Blog

1973 births
Living people
Ethiopian female long-distance runners
Ethiopian female marathon runners
Olympic athletes of Ethiopia
Athletes (track and field) at the 1996 Summer Olympics
Athletes (track and field) at the 2000 Summer Olympics
Athletes (track and field) at the 2008 Summer Olympics
World Athletics Championships medalists
World Athletics Championships athletes for Ethiopia
World Athletics Half Marathon Championships winners
Chicago Marathon female winners
UNICEF Goodwill Ambassadors
Goodwill Games medalists in athletics
World Athletics Indoor Championships winners
World Athletics Championships winners
Competitors at the 2001 Goodwill Games